The Men's individual large hill event of the FIS Nordic World Ski Championships 2017 was held on 2 March 2017.

Results

Qualification
The qualification was held on 1 March 2017.

Final
The final was held on 2 March 2017.

References

Individual large hill